Sanhe is a township of Dongfeng County in southwestern Jilin province, China, located  southeast of the county seat and just northwest of Meihekou. , it has 16 villages under its administration.

References 

Township-level divisions of Jilin
Dongfeng County
Ethnic townships of the People's Republic of China
Korean diaspora in China